Christ Episcopal Church is a historic Episcopal church building located at Walton in Delaware County, New York.  It was built in 1832 in the Federal Gothic style and received an overlay of Victorian period decoration in 1883.  It is a wood-frame structure and characterized by a rectangular meeting house plan, including a vestibule, nave, chancel, and sacristy.  It features a steep gable roof and a central projecting entrance tower surmounted by a wooden belfry.

It was added to the National Register of Historic Places in 1999.

See also
National Register of Historic Places listings in Delaware County, New York

References

Episcopal church buildings in New York (state)
Churches on the National Register of Historic Places in New York (state)
National Register of Historic Places in Delaware County, New York
Carpenter Gothic church buildings in New York (state)
Churches completed in 1834
19th-century Episcopal church buildings
Churches in Delaware County, New York